This is a list of issue covers of TV Guide magazine from the decade of the 1980s, from January 1980 to December 1989. The entries on this table include each cover's subjects and their artists (photographer or illustrator). This list is for the regular weekly issues of TV Guide; any one-time-only special issues are not included.

1980

1981

1982

1983

1984

1985

1986

1987

1988

1989
{| class="wikitable sortable" width=100% style="font-size:100%;"
! width=6%|Issue date
! width=53%|Cover subject
! width=12%|Type of cover
! width=29%|Artist
|-
|1/7/1989||"Our 8th Annual J. Fred Muggs Awards, featuring honorees Bryant Gumbel, Jane Fonda, and Geraldo Rivera||Photo montage||
|-
|1/14/1989 || Cybill Shepherd and Bruce Willis of Moonlighting||Photograph||
|-
|1/21/1989||"Rock Stars on TV," featuring Elvis Presley, Bruce Springsteen, Madonna, and Michael Jackson||Photo montage||
|-
|1/28/1989||John Goodman and Roseanne Barr of Roseanne ||Illustration ||
|-
|2/4/1989||"Get Ready for a Hot February," featuring Catherine Oxenberg, Burt Reynolds, Lisa Hartman, Billy Crystal, Robert Duvall and Diane Ladd ||Photo montage||
|-
|2/11/1989||Larry Hagman of Dallas||Photo montage||
|-
|2/18/1989||"The Best Children's Shows on TV," featuring Mighty Mouse, ALF, Bill Cosby and Keshia Knight Pulliam, Big Bird, Pee-wee Herman and Garfield||Illustration||
|-
|2/25/1989||Victoria Principal of Naked Lies||Photograph||
|-
|3/4/1989||Vanna White of Wheel of Fortune||Photograph||
|-
|3/11/1989||"Stephen Birmingham's One-Upmanship Guide," featuring Ken Olin and Mel Harris of thirtysomething, Candice Bergen of Murphy Brown, and Corbin Bernsen of L.A. Law||Photo montage||
|-
|3/18/1989||Oprah Winfrey, Jackée and Robin Givens of The Women of Brewster Place||Photograph|| 
|-
|3/25/1989||"What TV Doesn't Tell You About The Oscars"||Photo montage||
|-
|4/1/1989||Susan Ruttan, Susan Dey, Jill Eikenberry and Michelle Greene of L.A. Law||Photo montage||
|-
|4/8/1989||"A Busy Person's Guide to TV: Getting the Most Out of Your Viewing," featuring Bruce Willis and Cybill Shepherd of Moonlighting; Alex Trebek of Jeopardy!; Mike Wallace of 60 Minutes; and Dan Lauria, Alley Mills, Fred Savage, Olivia d'Abo, Jason Hervey of The Wonder Years||Montage||
|-
|4/15/1989||Joan Collins of Dynasty, breaking through a picture of John Forsythe||Photograph||
|-
|4/22/1989||Jason Bateman of The Hogan Family and Kirk Cameron of Growing Pains|| ||
|-
|4/29/1989||"May Sweeps: What's Hot," featuring Robert Mitchum and Victoria Tennant of War and Remembrance; Brigitte Nielsen of Murder by Moonlight; Holly Hunter and Ali Grant in Roe v. Wade; and David Keith as Lt. Col. Oliver North in Guts and Glory||Photo montage||
|-
|5/6/1989||"TV is 50 - Happy Birthday!" featuring John F. Kennedy, Jr.; Keshia Knight Pulliam and Bill Cosby; Edwin "Buzz" Aldrin; Carroll O'Connor; Harry Morgan, Mike Farrell and Alan Alda; Desi Arnaz and Lucille Ball; Georgia Engel, Valerie Harper and Mary Tyler Moore||Photo montage||
|-
|5/13/1989||Tracy Scoggins of Dynasty||Photograph||
|-
|5/20/1989||Roseanne Barr of Roseanne||Photograph||
|-
|5/27/1989||Kirstie Alley and Ted Danson of Cheers||Illustration||John Solie
|-
|6/3/1989||Oprah Winfrey||Photograph||
|-
|6/10/1989||Fred Savage and Danica McKellar of The Wonder Years||Photograph||
|-
|6/17/1989||Donna Mills of Knots Landing||Photograph||
|-
|6/24/1989||"The Joys of Summer," featuring Tristan Rogers & Edie Lehmann of General Hospital and James DePaiva & Jessica Tuck of One Life to Live||Photo montage||
|-
|7/1/1989||"TV Favorites Go For It In Movies," featuring Virginia Madsen, Tom Selleck, Michael J. Fox and Don Harvey||Photo montage||
|-
|7/8/1989||"The Best and Worst We Saw: An Irreverent Look at the Past Season"||Photo montage||
|-
|7/15/1989||"The 1989 Network News All-Star Team," featuring Tom Brokaw, Peter Jennings, Andrea Mitchell, and Lesley Stahl||Photo montage||
|-
|7/22/1989||"TV Stars to Watch — and Ignore — if You Want to Look Sharp," featuring Roseanne Barr and Nicollette Sheridan||Photo montage||
|-
|7/29/1989||David Faustino, Christina Applegate, Ed O'Neill, Katey Sagal, and Buck the dog of Married... with Children||Photograph||
|-
|8/5/1989||"In Defense of Tabloid TV," featuring Phil Donahue, Geraldo Rivera, Maury Povich, and Oprah Winfrey||Photo montage||
|-
|8/12/1989||"TV's New News Queens," featuring Mary Alice Williams, Maria Shriver, Diane Sawyer, and Connie Chung||Photo montage||
|-
|8/19/1989||Crystal Gayle and Loretta Lynn||Photograph||
|-
|8/26/1989||Oprah Winfrey|| ||
|-
|9/2/1989||"Two Fall Classics," featuring Miss America 1989 Gretchen Carlson and NFL players Lawrence Taylor, Mark Rypien & Eric Dorsey||Photo montage||
|-
|9/9/1989||Fall Preview (Special Issue)||Text graphic||Jeffrey Lynch
|-
|9/16/1989||Roseanne Barr of Roseanne and Bill Cosby of The Cosby Show||Illustration||Chris Notarile
|-
|9/23/1989||"The 11 Stars You'd Better Keep an Eye On," featuring Kimberly Foster of Dallas, Khrystyne Haje of Head of the Class, and Richard Tyson of Hardball||Photo montage||
|-
|9/30/1989||Elizabeth Taylor and Mark Harmon of Sweet Bird of Youth||Photograph||
|-
|10/7/1989||Delta Burke of Designing Women and Gerald McRaney of Major Dad||Photograph||
|-
|10/14/1989||"Hot Choices This Week," featuring The World Series, Perry King and Chynna Phillips of Roxanne: The Prize Pulitzer, and Faye Dunaway of Cold Sassy Tree||Photo montage||
|-
|10/21/1989||Jamie Lee Curtis of Anything But Love||Photograph||
|-
|10/28/1989||Lane Smith as Richard Nixon of The Final DaysInset: Richard Grieco of Booker||Photograph||
|-
|11/4/1989||"Knockout November," featuring Farrah Fawcett of Small Sacrifices, Valerie Bertinelli of Taken Away, and Michael Keaton of the film Batman||Photo montage||
|-
|11/11/1989||Richard Chamberlain of Island Son||Photograph||
|-
|11/18/1989||Courteney Cox and Barry Bostwick of Till We Meet Again||Photograph||
|-
|11/25/1989||Victoria Principal of Blind Witness||Photograph||
|-
|12/2/1989||"Viewer's Guide to the Holiday Specials," featuring Bob Hope, Natalie Wood and Edmund Gwenn of Miracle on 34th Street, Peanuts, Julie Andrews and Carol Burnett of Julie and Carol Together Again, and Kenny Rogers Jr. and Kenny Rogers of Christmas in America: A Love Story||Photo montage||
|-
|12/9/1989||"The 80s," featuring Vanna White, Don Johnson, Oprah Winfrey, Ted Koppel, Hulk Hogan, David Letterman, Bill Cosby, Joan Collins, ALF, Sam Donaldson, Ronald Reagan, Tom Selleck, Larry Hagman, Michael J. Fox, Photo by Peter Kredenser Dan Rather, and Roseanne Barr||Photo montage||ALF: Mario Casilli
|-
|12/16/1989||Neil Patrick Harris of Doogie Howser, M.D.Inset: Lucille Ball||Photograph||
|-
|12/23/1989||Candice Bergen of Murphy BrownInset: Scott Bakula of Quantum Leap||Photograph||
|-
|12/30/1989||Julia Duffy of Newhart and Jean Smart of Designing Women with New Years babies Seib Blake and Lindsay Reece<small>Inset: Susan Lucci of All My Children</small>||Photograph||
|}

Sources
 Covers and table of contents page descriptions for the various issues.
 TV Guide: Fifty Years of Television, New York, NY: Crown Publishers, 2002. 
 Stephen Hofer, ed., TV Guide: The Official Collectors Guide'', Braintree, Massachusetts: BangZoom Publishers, 2006. .
 "50 Greatest TV Guide Covers", article from the June 15, 2002 edition of TV Guide
 Information from ellwanger.tv's TV Guide collection section

External links
TV Guide cover archive: 1980s

Covers
1980s television-related lists
1980s in American television
TV Guide